Ethmia hammella is a moth in the family Depressariidae. It is found in Costa Rica, Panama and on Gorgona Island in Colombia.

The ground color of the forewings is pale yellowish white, indistinctly speckled and distinctly blotched with deep steel blue. The ground color of the hindwings is pale brown, but darker apically. The costal area is white. Adults are on wing in March, May, June, August, October and November.

References

Moths described in 1910
hammella